Eray is a masculine Turkish given name. People named Eray include:

 Eray Ataseven (born 1993), Turkish footballer
 Eray Birniçan (born 1988), Turkish footballer
 Eray Cömert (born 1998), Swiss professional footballer
 Eray İşcan (born 1991), Turkish footballer
 Eray Şamdan (born 1997), Turkish karateka

Turkish masculine given names

de:Eray